MOSAIC may refer to:
Mosaic (geodemography)
MOSAIC Threat Assessment Systems
MOSAIC (housing cooperative)
MOSAIC (web browser)
MOSAIC (organization) Canadian immigration and refugee support organization
Model of Syntax Acquisition in Children, an instance of CHREST
MOSAIC (Mobile System for Accurate ICBM Control) – predecessor of Global Positioning System
MOSAIC (Ministry of Supply Automatic Integrator and Computer) – early computer

See also
Mosaic (disambiguation)